The Ocna Sibiului mine is a large salt mine located in central Romania, in Sibiu County, close to Ocna Sibiului. The mine represents one of the largest salt reserves in Romania, having estimated reserves of 61 billion tonnes of NaCl.

Lakes of the salt mine 
 Lacul Auster 
 Lake Brâncoveanu 
 Lake Gura Minei 
 Lake Rândunica 
 Lacul Negru
 Lacul cu Nămol 
 Lake Horea 
 Lake Cloșca 
 Lake Crișan 
 Lake Mâţelor 
 Lacul Fără Fund 
 Lacul Verde (Freshwater lake)
 Lake Pânzelor 
 Lacul Vrăjitoarelor (Freshwater lake)
 Lake Avram Iancu-Ocnița
 Lake Mihai Viteazul

References 

Salt mines in Romania